Ovenna agonchae is a moth of the  subfamily Arctiinae. It was described by Plötz in 1880. It is found in Cameroon, the Democratic Republic of Congo, Equatorial Guinea, Ghana, Nigeria, South Africa and Uganda.

References

Lithosiini
Moths described in 1880